Ihor Yevhenovych Krapyvkin (14 May 1966 – 18 February 2021) was a Ukrainian footballer and goalkeeping coach.

Career
Ihor Krapyvkin is a pupil of Dnepropetrovsk football. In 1984 he performed in the double "Dnieper". Not having a chance to make his debut as a member of the USSR champions, he went to gain experience in the teams of the second league "Kryvbass" and "Crystal". He served in the SKA in Odessa.

From 1991 to 1993 he defended the door of Bukovyna Chernivtsi. In this team, Igor made his debut in the first league of the USSR championship, and then - on March 7, 1992, and in the top league of the Ukrainian championship (the first match against "Niva" Ternopil - 2: 1). In the 1993–94 season, the Chernivtsi team fought for survival in the top league and released Krapivkin to the first league Spartak Ivano-Frankivsk. During the season in Spartak Ivano-Frankivsk, Igor played 12 matches and won gold medals with the team in the first league of the Ukrainian championship. After playing half of the season in the major league for Spartak Ivano-Frankivsk, he moved to the Slovak team of the major league "Hemlon" (Humenne). Winner of the Slovak Cup 1995–96.

In 1996 he returned to Ukraine. After returning he played in the teams Spartak Ivano-Frankivsk, Khutrovyk Tysmenytsia, Desna Chernihiv, Mykolaiv, Polissya Zhytomyr, "Bumazhnik". In 1997 he was a member of the Russian team Druzhba Maykop. He finished his career in 2001 in "Bukovina". In total, he played 68 official matches for Bukovyna Chernivtsi in the championship and 7 in the cup).

In total, he played 52 matches in the Premier League of Ukraine, conceding 78 goals (Bukovyna Chernivtsi(33 matches, 43 conceded), Prykarpattia (13 matches, 19 conceded), Nikolaev (6 goals, 16 conceded))

Coaching career
In the 2002–03 season he coached Kryvbas Kryvyi Rih goalkeepers. In 2005 he coached the backup of the Kryvyi Rih team. Participated in matches of Kryvbass veterans.

References

External links 
 Ihor Krapyvkin footballfacts.ru 
 Ihor Krapyvkin allplayers.in.ua
 

1966 births
2021 deaths
Footballers from Dnipro
Ukrainian people of Russian descent
Soviet footballers
Ukrainian footballers
Association football midfielders
FC Kuban Krasnodar players
FC Dnipro players
FC Kryvbas Kryvyi Rih players
SKA Odesa players
FC Krystal Kherson players
FC Chornomorets Odesa players
FC Bukovyna Chernivtsi players
FC Khutrovyk Tysmenytsia players
ŠK Futura Humenné players
FC Spartak Ivano-Frankivsk players
FC Druzhba Maykop players
FC Desna Chernihiv players
MFC Mykolaiv players
FC Polissya Zhytomyr players
FC Papirnyk Malyn players
FC Hirnyk Kryvyi Rih players
Soviet First League players
Soviet Second League players
Ukrainian Premier League players
Ukrainian First League players
Ukrainian Second League players
Ukrainian expatriate footballers
Expatriate footballers in Slovakia
Expatriate footballers in Russia
Ukrainian expatriate sportspeople in Slovakia
Ukrainian expatriate sportspeople in Russia